Adoxophyes libralis is a species of moth of the family Tortricidae. It is found on Samoa in the South Pacific.

References

Moths described in 1927
Adoxophyes
Moths of Oceania